Lasionycta phoca is a moth of the family Noctuidae. It occurs in eastern and central Canada with records from Labrador to the west coast of Hudson Bay.

Adults fly over tundra, are diurnal and nocturnal, and come to light.

Adults are on wing in June and July.

External links
A Revision of Lasionycta Aurivillius (Lepidoptera, Noctuidae) for North America and notes on Eurasian species, with descriptions of 17 new species, 6 new subspecies, a new genus, and two new species of Tricholita Grote

Lasionycta
Moths of North America
Moths described in 1864